Exposition Park is the name of more than one place:

Exposition Park (Dallas), a neighborhood in south Dallas, Texas
Exposition Park (Kansas City), a former baseball park in Kansas City
Exposition Park (Los Angeles), a public park with both cultural and sports facilities
Exposition Park (Los Angeles neighborhood), a neighborhood that includes the above park
Exposition Park (Pittsburgh), a former baseball park in Pittsburgh
Exposition Park, now Conneaut Lake Park, Conneaut Lake, Pennsylvania
Exposition Park, the original name of Starlight Park in the Bronx, New York City
Park of the Exposition, a public park in Lima, Peru